Buffalo Township is a township in Cloud County, Kansas, USA.  As of the 2000 census, its population was 119.

History
Buffalo Township was organized in 1866.

Geography
According to the USGS, it contains two cemeteries: Fairview and West Branch.

The streams of West Branch Wolf Creek and Whites Creek run through this township.

References

 USGS Geographic Names Information System (GNIS)

External links
 US-Counties.com
 City-Data.com

Townships in Cloud County, Kansas
Townships in Kansas